Progreso or Progresso (Spanish, Portuguese and Italian  for "Progress") may refer to:

Places

Angola
 Progresso, Belas, Luanda, Angola

Belize
Progresso, Belize, village in the Corozal District

Bolivia
 Progreso Airport

Guatemala
 El Progreso Department, smallest department in population, whose capital is Guastatoya 
 El Progreso, Jutiapa, municipality in the Jutiapa department 
 Nuevo Progreso, San Marcos, municipality in the San Marcos department

Honduras
 El Progreso, Yoro, municipality in the department of Yoro

Mexico
 El Progreso, Tamaulipas, community in the Nuevo Laredo municipality
 Progreso, Baja California
 Progreso, Coahuila
Progreso, Hidalgo
Progreso, Yucatán, port city in the state of Yucatán
Nuevo Progreso, Río Bravo, Tamaulipas
 Progreso (municipality of Coahuila)
 Cuetzala del Progreso
 Jaral del Progreso
 Tamazulapam del Progreso
Plaza Nuevo Progreso, bullring in Guadalajara, Jalisco

Panama
Progreso, Chiriquí

Peru
 Progreso District

Spain
 Barrio del Progreso

United States
 Progreso, Texas, city in Hidalgo County
Progreso Independent School District, public school district in Progreso, Texas, USA 
 Progreso Lakes, Texas, city in Hidalgo County
Progresso, New Mexico, small unincorporated town in Torrance County

Uruguay
 Progreso, Uruguay, city and municipality in the Canelones Department

Politics
Democratic Party for Progress – Angolan National Alliance (Partido Democrático para o Progresso), political party in Angola
National Union for Democracy and Progress (São Tomé and Príncipe) (União Nacional para a Democracia e Progresso), political party in São Tomé and Príncipe
People's Party of Progress (Partido Popular do Progresso), political party in São Tomé and Príncipe
Union for Promoting Progress (União Promotora para o Progresso), political party in the Chinese Special Administrative Region of Macau
National Union for Democracy and Progress (Guinea-Bissau) (União Nacional para a Democracia e o Progresso), political party in Guinea-Bissau

Sports
C. A. Progreso, football club in Montevideo, Uruguay
 C.D. Honduras Progreso, a Honduran football club
Progresso Associação do Sambizanga, Angolan football club
 Sport Progreso, a Peruvian football club

Media
Progreso, journal for the constructed language Ido
, newspaper from Lugo, Galicia, Spain
, newspaper from Ciudad Bolivar, Venezuela

Other
Progresso, Italian food manufacturer
Progresso pencil, a brand of woodless coloring pencils manufactured by Koh-i-Noor Hardtmuth
Progresso Spacecraft, a planned crewed space vehicle by the Brazilian Space Agency

 Club del Progreso, an aristocratic club of Buenos Aires
 Egipcia Progreso, a typeface
 Radio Progreso, a Cuban Spanish language radio station

See also
 Nuevo Progreso (disambiguation)